East End Historic District may refer to:

 East End Historic District (Thomasville, Georgia), listed on the NRHP in Georgia
 East End Historic District (Valdosta, Georgia), listed on the NRHP in Georgia
 East End Historic District (Quincy, Illinois), listed on the NRHP in Illinois
 East End Historic District (Ipswich, Massachusetts), listed on the NRHP in Massachusetts
 East End Historic District (Meridian, Mississippi), listed on the NRHP in Mississippi
 East End Historic District (Newburgh, New York), listed on the NRHP in New York
 East End Historic District (Ahoskie, North Carolina), listed on the NRHP in North Carolina
 East End Historic District (Lebanon, Ohio), listed on the NRHP in Ohio
 East End Historic District (Galveston, Texas), listed on the NRHP in Texas
 East End Historic District (Charleston, West Virginia), listed on the NRHP in West Virginia
 East End Historic District (Middleton, Wisconsin), listed on the NRHP in Wisconsin